Vajrakarur is a village in Anantapur district of the Indian state of Andhra Pradesh. It is the mandal headquarters of Vajrakarur mandal in Anantapur revenue division.

This village was under the rule of Pemmasani Nayaks. A fort was constructed by Pemmasani Timma Naidu who had developed this village significantly and attracted many visitors during Vijayanagar times.

Geography 
It is located at. It has an average elevation of 447 metres (1469 ft). This is a major panchayati with a population of 7482.

Demographics 
According to Indian census, 2001, the demographic details of Vajrakarur mandal is as follows:
 Total Population: 	7482
 Male Population: 	3815	and Female Population: 	3667

Panchayats 
The following is the list of village panchayats in Vajrakarur mandal.
1. Vajrakarur
2. Ganjikunta
3. Thatrakal
4. NNP Thanda
5. VPP Thanda
6. Venkatam palli
7. J Rampuram
8. Kamalapadu
9. Gulyapalyam
10. Konakondla
11. Chayapuram
12. Hothur
13. Pyapily
14. PC kotha kota
15. Kadamalakunta
16. Ragulapadu
17. Pottipadu 18. Pandikunta

References 

Villages in Anantapur district
Mandal headquarters in Anantapur district